Baba Traoré (born 13 October 1992) is a French professional footballer who plays as a left back for Championnat National 2 club Hyères.

Career
In January 2019, Traoré was loaned to Brest from Le Havre until the end of the season.

Personal life
As a youth player, Baba Traoré played along his brother Cheick Traoré, who is also a professional footballer, in his native Pierrefitte-sur-Seine. Traoré is of Malian descent.

References

External links
 

1992 births
Living people
French footballers
French people of Malian descent
Association football defenders
LB Châteauroux players
Vendée Poiré-sur-Vie Football players
Football Bourg-en-Bresse Péronnas 01 players
AJ Auxerre players
Le Havre AC players
Stade Brestois 29 players
Hyères FC players
Ligue 2 players
Championnat National players
Championnat National 2 players
Championnat National 3 players